Phlegra langanoensis is a jumping spider species in the genus Phlegra that lives in Ethiopia and Zimbabwe. The male was first described in 2008.

References

Salticidae
Arthropods of Ethiopia
Arthropods of Zimbabwe
Spiders of Africa
Spiders described in 2008
Taxa named by Wanda Wesołowska